Ursula Kathleen Hicks (17 September 189616 July 1985), styled as Lady Hicks upon her marriage, was an Irish-born economist and academic.

Early life
She was daughter of William and Isabella Webb, born in Dublin on 17 September 1896. She was educated at Roedean and Somerville College, University of Oxford. She studied and lectured at the London School of Economics. She married fellow academic Sir John Hicks in 1935.

Academic career
Ursula Hicks was a renowned public finance and development economist. Hicks was a co-founder of the Review of Economic Studies and Managing Editor from 1933 to 1961. She was a Fellow of Linacre College, Oxford, where a building is named after her. Her 1946 paper argued against the economic usefulness of the distinction between direct taxes and indirect tax (as to who the nominal payer is) versus taxes on income and expenditures (outlays), a distinction now recognized in national accounting. Lady Hicks received an Honorary Fellowship at the Institute of Social Studies in 1967.

Selected publications
 1946. "The Terminology of Tax Analysis," Economic Journal, 56(221), p p. 38-50.
 1947, 3rd ed., 1968. Public Finance,  Cambridge Economic Handbooks.
 1954, revised 1958.  British Public Finances: Their Structure and Development 1880 - 1952, Oxford University Press
  1961. Development from Below. Clarendon Press. Opening paragraph & review excerpt.
 1978. Federalism: Failure and Success: A Comparative Study. Oxford. Review excerpt.

References

Sources
 Alan Peacock, [1987] 2008. “Hicks, Ursula Kathleen (1896–1985)," The New Palgrave Dictionary of Economics''.

External links
 Profile at Institute of Social Studies

British economists
British women economists
1896 births
1985 deaths
Alumni of the London School of Economics
Alumni of Somerville College, Oxford
Wives of knights